Abbas Duzduzani was an Iranian politician who served in Mohammad-Ali Rajai cabinet. He was a founder and a first commander of Islamic Revolutionary Guard Corps.

References

1942 births
2018 deaths
People from Tabriz
Islamic Revolutionary Guard Corps personnel of the Iran–Iraq War
Deputies of Tabriz, Osku and Azarshahr
Government ministers of Iran
Islamic Revolutionary Guard Corps officers
Deputies of Tehran, Rey, Shemiranat and Eslamshahr
Members of the 1st Islamic Consultative Assembly
Members of the 2nd Islamic Consultative Assembly
Members of the 3rd Islamic Consultative Assembly
Islamic Association of Teachers of Iran politicians
Chairmen of City Council of Tehran
Tehran Councillors 1999–2003
Islamic Iran Participation Front politicians
Islamic Nations Party members
Mojahedin of the Islamic Revolution Organization politicians